Halima Ouardiri is a Swiss-Canadian film director, producer, and screenwriter.

Career 
Ouardiri first garnered acclaim for her 2010 short film Mokhtar, which was a shortlisted Jutra Award nominee for Best Live Action Short Film at the 13th Jutra Awards in 2011, and her 2019 short film Mutts (Clebs), which won a Crystal Bear for best short film in the Generation 14Plus program at the 70th Berlin International Film Festival in 2020.

Born in Geneva to a Swiss mother and a Moroccan father, Ouardiri moved to Montreal to study film at the Mel Hoppenheim School of Cinema. In addition to her own films, she was credited as a producer on Kalina Bertin's 2017 documentary film Manic. In 2018, she was one of eight women filmmakers selected for the Academy of Canadian Cinema and Television's Apprenticeship for Women Directors program, alongside Kathleen Hepburn, Kirsten Carthew, Alicia K. Harris, Allison White, Asia Youngman, Tiffany Hsiung, and Kristina Wagenbauer.

Ouardiri's first narrative feature film, The Camel Driving School, entered production in 2020. As of 2022, the film has not yet been released.

References

External links

21st-century Canadian screenwriters
21st-century Canadian women writers
Canadian women film directors
Canadian women screenwriters
Canadian women film producers
Swiss women film directors
Swiss screenwriters
Swiss film producers
Swiss women film producers
Swiss emigrants to Canada
Film directors from Montreal
Writers from Montreal
Concordia University alumni
Living people
Canadian documentary film producers
Year of birth missing (living people)
Canadian women documentary filmmakers